BBAM LLC is an aircraft lease company based in San Francisco, United States. BBAM was originally part of the Australian group Babcock & Brown.

In 2017, it was the seventh largest aircraft leasing company in the world, managing a fleet of 390 aircraft.

See also
Babcock & Brown Aircraft Management (BBAM) was founded in 1989 and has been led by founder and CEO, Steve Zissis, since its inception. Today, BBAM is one of the world’s largest aircraft lessors, with more than $14 billion in aviation assets under management. BBAM is a private partnership owned by its management team, affiliates of Onex Corporation, and affiliates of GIC, the sovereign wealth fund of the Government of Singapore.

For more than 30 years, Babcock & Brown Aircraft Management (BBAM) has partnered with the world’s airlines to deliver fleet financing solutions tailored to their needs and goals. With access to diverse and deep pools of long-term capital, and decades of industry experience, BBAM delivers flexible financing and certainty of execution to airlines of all sizes in every market condition.

BBAM has financed $40+ billion in commercial jet aircraft for more than 100 airlines worldwide and built long-term partnerships with airlines by reliably delivering competitive financing that supports their needs and goals at all stages of growth, and in every market condition.
BBAM’s managed platform provides access to diverse and deep pools of long-term capital. The global team of aviation professionals has executed some of the industry’s largest and most complex leasing transactions.

References

External links

Aircraft leasing companies
Companies based in San Francisco